A number of polities have declared independence and sought diplomatic recognition from the international community as sovereign states, but have not been universally recognised as such. These entities often have de facto control of their territory. A number of such entities have existed in the past.

There are two traditional theories used to indicate how a sovereign state comes into being. The declarative theory (codified in the 1933 Montevideo Convention) defines a state as a person in international law if it meets the following criteria:

 a defined territory
 a permanent population
 a government, and
 a capacity to enter into relations with other states.

According to the declarative theory, an entity's statehood is independent of its recognition by other states. By contrast, the constitutive theory defines a state as a person of international law only if it is recognised as such by other states that are already a member of the international community.

Quasi-states often reference either or both doctrines in order to legitimise their claims to statehood. There are, for example, entities which meet the declarative criteria (with de facto partial or complete control over their claimed territory, a government and a permanent population), but whose statehood is not recognised by any other states. Non-recognition is often a result of conflicts with other countries that claim those entities as integral parts of their territory. In other cases, two or more partially recognised states may claim the same territorial area, with each of them de facto in control of a portion of it (as have been the cases of the Republic of China (ROC; commonly called "Taiwan") and the People's Republic of China (PRC), and North and South Korea). Entities that are recognised by only a minority of the world's states usually reference the declarative doctrine to legitimise their claims.

In many situations, international non-recognition is influenced by the presence of a foreign military force in the territory of the contested entity, making the description of the country's de facto status problematic. The international community can judge this military presence too intrusive, reducing the entity to a puppet state where effective sovereignty is retained by the foreign power. Historical cases in this sense can be seen in Japanese-led Manchukuo or the German-created Slovak Republic and Independent State of Croatia before and during World War II. In the 1996 case Loizidou v. Turkey, the European Court of Human Rights judged Turkey for having exercised authority in the territory of Northern Cyprus.

There are also entities which do not have control over any territory or do not unequivocally meet the declarative criteria for statehood but have been recognised to exist as sovereign entities by at least one other state. Historically this has happened in the case of the Holy See (1870–1929), Estonia, Latvia and Lithuania (during Soviet annexation), and the State of Palestine at the time of its declaration of independence in 1988. The Sovereign Military Order of Malta is currently in this position. See list of governments in exile for unrecognised governments without control over the territory claimed.

List criteria 
The criteria for inclusion on this list is limited to polities which claim sovereignty, those that lack recognition from at least one UN member state, and either:

 satisfy the declarative theory of statehood, or
 be recognised as a state by at least one UN member state.

Background 

There are  United Nations (UN) member states, while both the Holy See and Palestine have observer state status in the United Nations. However, some countries fulfill the declarative criteria, are recognised by the large majority of other states and are members of the United Nations, but are still included in the list here because one or more other states do not recognise their statehood, due to territorial claims or other conflicts.

Some states maintain informal (officially non-diplomatic) relations with states that do not officially recognise them. The Republic of China (ROC; commonly called "Taiwan") is one such state, as it maintains unofficial relations with many other states through its Economic and Cultural Offices, which allow regular consular services. This allows the ROC to have economic relations even with states that do not formally recognise it. A total of 56 states, including Germany, Italy, the United States, and the United Kingdom, maintain some form of unofficial mission in Taiwan. Kosovo, Artsakh (Nagorno-Karabakh), Northern Cyprus, Abkhazia, Transnistria, the Sahrawi Republic, Somaliland, and Palestine also host informal diplomatic missions, and/or maintain special delegations or other informal missions abroad.

States that are UN members or observers

States that are neither UN members nor UN observers

Excluded entities 
 The Sovereign Military Order of Malta (SMOM) is a sovereign non-state entity and is not included, as it claims neither statehood nor territory. It has established full diplomatic relations with 112 sovereign states as a sovereign subject of international law, and also maintains full diplomatic relations with the European Union, the Holy See, and the State of Palestine. The order maintains official, but not diplomatic, relations with Belgium, France, Switzerland, Luxembourg and Canada. Additionally, it participates in the United Nations as an observer entity. Some states recognize SMOM as a sovereign state, rather than a sovereign subject of international law. The Republic of San Marino in 1939 recognized SMOM as a sovereign state in its own right. Italy's Supreme Court of Cassation decreed on 6 June 1974 that, "the Sovereign Military Hospitaller Order of Malta constitutes a sovereign international subject, in all terms equal, even if without territory, to a foreign state with which Italy has normal diplomatic relations, so there is no doubt, as already this Supreme Court has warned, that it has the legal treatment of foreign states". As Italy recognizes, in addition to extraterritoriality, the exercise by SMOM of all the prerogatives of sovereignty in its headquarters, Italian sovereignty and SMOM sovereignty uniquely coexist without overlapping.
 Uncontacted peoples who either live in societies that cannot be defined as states or whose statuses as such are not definitively known.
 Some subnational entities and regions function as de facto independent states, with the central government exercising little or no control over their territory. These entities, however, do not explicitly claim to be independent states and are therefore not included. Examples include Galmudug and Puntland in Somalia, Gaza in Palestine, the Kurdistan Region in Iraq, Rojava in Syria, the Wa State in Myanmar, and the areas under control of the Houthi movement in Yemen.
 Entities considered to be micronations are not included. Even though micronations generally claim to be sovereign and independent, it is often debatable whether a micronation truly controls its claimed territory. For this reason, micronations are usually not considered of geopolitical relevance. For a list of micronations, see list of micronations.
 Those areas undergoing current civil wars and other situations with problems over government succession, regardless of temporary alignment with the inclusion criteria (e.g. by receiving recognition as state or legitimate government), where the conflict is still in its active phase, the situation is too rapidly changing and no relatively stable quasi-states have emerged yet.
 Rebel groups that have declared independence and exert some control over territory, but that reliable sources do not describe as meeting the threshold of a sovereign state under international law. Examples include Ambazonia and the Southern Movement; see list of rebel groups that control territory for a more complete list of such groups.
 Those of the current irredentist movements and governments in exile that do not satisfy the inclusion criteria by simultaneously not satisfying the declarative theory and not having been recognised as state or legitimate government by any other state.
 Some states can be slow to establish relations with new UN member states and thus do not explicitly recognise them, despite having no dispute and sometimes favorable relations. These are excluded from the list. Examples include Croatia and Montenegro.

See also 

 Community for Democracy and Rights of Nations
 Decolonization
 Diplomatic recognition
 Exclusive mandate
 Frozen conflict
 Gallery of sovereign state flags
 Government in exile
 Irredentism
 List of civil wars
 List of current heads of state of states with limited recognition
 List of historical unrecognized states and dependencies
 List of micronations
 List of modern proto-states
 List of rebel groups that control territory
 List of sovereign states
 List of territorial disputes
 Nation state
 Rump state
 Self-determination
 Separatism
 List of active autonomist and secessionist movements
 List of active separatist movements recognized by intergovernmental organizations
 Sovereignty
 Territorial dispute
 Territorial integrity
 Unilateral declaration of independence
 Unrepresented Nations and Peoples Organization

Notes

References

Further reading 
 Adrian Florea, "De Facto States: Survival and Disappearance (1945–2011)." International Studies Quarterly, Volume 61, Issue 2, June 2017, Pages 337–351

 
 
Nationalities Papers. Special Issue on the Emergence and Resilience of Parastates.

Limited recognition